The terrestrial fauna of the Cocos (Keeling) Islands is unsurprisingly depauperate, because of the small land area of the islands, their lack of diverse habitats, and their isolation from large land-masses. However, the fauna dependent on marine resources is much richer.

Birds
These comprise the endemic subspecies of buff-banded rail, the introduced green junglefowl and helmeted guineafowl, the white-breasted waterhen, eastern reef egret, nankeen night heron and the introduced Christmas white-eye. Four other introduced species are now extinct in the Islands. Several other landbird species have been recorded occasionally, but none has established a breeding population.

Migratory waders recorded in the islands include some regular visitors as well as vagrants.  None breeds there.  However, North Keeling is important for breeding seabirds, with sizeable numbers of red-footed boobies, great and lesser frigatebirds, common noddies and white terns.  Other breeding seabirds include wedge-tailed shearwaters, masked boobies, brown boobies, red-tailed and white-tailed tropicbirds, and sooty terns.  It is possible that the herald petrel breeds there as well.

Presumably, before human occupation of the islands in the 19th century, seabirds bred on both atolls.  However, with the establishment of a human population and the introduction of rodents to the southern atoll, significant seabird colonies are now restricted to the northern atoll of North Keeling.  Although the Cocos islanders used to visit North Keeling regularly to harvest seabirds, this practice largely ceased with the establishment of Pulu Keeling National Park in 1995.

List of birds
 Phasianidae
 Red junglefowl, Gallus gallus - feral domestic fowl
 Green junglefowl, Gallus varius - introduced, breeding
 Anatidae
 Pacific black duck, Anas superciliosa - vagrant
 Green-winged teal, Anas crecca - vagrant
 Hardhead, Aythya australis - vagrant
 Procellariidae
 Bulwer's petrel, Bulweria bulwerii - vagrant
 Herald petrel, Pterodroma arminjoniana - possibly breeding
 Wedge-tailed shearwater, Ardenna pacificus - breeding 
 Diomedeidae
 Yellow-nosed albatross, Thalassarche chlororhynchos - vagrant
 Phaethontidae
 White-tailed tropicbird, Phaethon lepturus - breeding 
 Red-tailed tropicbird, Phaethon rubricauda - breeding 
 Sulidae
 Masked booby, Sula dactylatra - breeding 
 Brown booby, Sula leucogaster - breeding 
 Red-footed booby, Sula sula - breeding 
 Phalacrocoracidae
 Great cormorant, Phalacrocorax carbo - vagrant
 Little black cormorant, Phalacrocorax sulcirostris - vagrant
 Little pied cormorant, Phalacrocorax melanoleucos - vagrant
 Fregatidae
 Christmas frigatebird, Fregata andrewsi - vagrant
 Lesser frigatebird, Fregata ariel - breeding 
 Great frigatebird, Fregata minor - breeding 
 Ardeidae
 Great egret, Ardea alba - vagrant
 Cattle egret, 	Bubulcus ibis - vagrant
 Intermediate egret, Ardea intermedia - vagrant
 Chinese pond-heron, Ardeola bacchus - vagrant
 Javan pond-heron, Ardeola speciosa - vagrant
 Striated heron, Butorides striatus - vagrant
 Little egret, Egretta garzetta - vagrant
 White-faced heron, Egretta novaehollandiae - vagrant
 Pacific reef-heron, Egretta sacra - breeding
 Western reef-heron, Egretta gularis 
 Malayan night-heron, Gorsachius melanolophus - vagrant
 Nankeen night-heron, Nycticorax caledonicus - breeding 
 Black-crowned night-heron, Nycticorax nycticorax - vagrant
 Black bittern, Ixobrychus flavicollis - vagrant
 Cinnamon bittern, Ixobrychus cinnamomeus - vagrant
 Schrenck's bittern, Ixobrychus eurhythmus - vagrant
 Yellow bittern, Ixobrychus sinensis - vagrant
 Threskiornithidae
 Glossy ibis, Plegadis falcinellus - vagrant
 Phoenicopteridae
 Greater flamingo, Phoenicopterus ruber - vagrant
 Accipitridae
 Oriental honey-buzzard, Pernis ptilorhynchus - vagrant
 Swamp harrier, Circus approximans - vagrant
 Chinese sparrowhawk, Accipiter soloensis - vagrant
 Japanese sparrowhawk, Accipiter gularis - vagrant
 Falconidae
 Nankeen kestrel, Falco cenchroides - vagrant
 Rallidae
 Eurasian moorhen, Gallinula chloropus - vagrant
 White-breasted waterhen, Amaurornis phoenicurus - breeding
 Cocos buff-banded rail, Gallirallus philippensis andrewsi - endemic subspecies
 Watercock, Gallicrex cinerea - vagrant
 Baillon's crake, Zapornia pusilla - vagrant
 Scolopacidae
 Common sandpiper, Actitis hypoleucos - regular visitor
 Ruddy turnstone, Arenaria interpres - regular visitor
 Sharp-tailed sandpiper, Calidris acuminata - vagrant
 Sanderling, Calidris alba - vagrant
 Curlew sandpiper, Calidris ferruginea - vagrant
 Red-necked stint, Calidris ruficollis - vagrant
 Red knot, Calidris canutus - vagrant
 Great knot, Calidris tenuirostris - vagrant
 Pin-tailed snipe, Gallinago stenura - vagrant
 Bar-tailed godwit, Limosa lapponica - vagrant
 Black-tailed godwit, Limosa limosa - vagrant
 Little curlew, Numenius minutus - vagrant
 Whimbrel, Numenius phaeopus - regular visitor
 Grey-tailed tattler, Tringa brevipes - vagrant
 Common greenshank, Tringa nebularia - regular visitor
 Common redshank, Tringa totanus - regular visitor
 Red-necked phalarope, Phalaropus lobatus - vagrant
 Recurvirostridae
 Black-winged stilt, Himantopus himantopus leucocephalus - vagrant
 Charadriidae
 Lesser sand-plover, Charadrius mongolus - vagrant
 Greater sand-plover, Charadrius leschenaultii - vagrant
 Caspian plover, Charadrius asiaticus - vagrant
 Oriental plover, Charadrius veredus - vagrant
 Pacific golden-plover, Pluvialis fulva - regular visitor
 Black-bellied plover, Pluvialis squatarola - vagrant
 Glareolidae
 Oriental pratincole, Glareola maldivarum - vagrant
 Laridae
 Common noddy, Anous stolidus - breeding
 Lesser noddy, Anous tenuirostris - vagrant
 White-winged tern, Chlidonias leucopterus - vagrant
 White tern, Gygis alba - breeding 
 Bridled tern, Onychoprion anaethetus - vagrant
 Sooty tern, Onychoprion fuscatus - breeding 
 Common tern, Sterna hirundo - vagrant
 Lesser crested tern, Thalasseus bergii - vagrant
 Greater crested tern, Thalasseus bengalensis - vagrant
 Saunders's tern Sternula saundersi - vagrant
 Columbidae
 Christmas imperial pigeon, Ducula whartoni - introduced, extinct
 Cuculidae
 Large hawk-cuckoo, Hierococcyx sparverioides - vagrant
 Oriental cuckoo, Cuculus saturatus - vagrant
 Indian cuckoo, Cuculus micropterus - vagrant
 Asian koel, Eudynamys scolopaceus - vagrant
 Strigidae
 Buffy fish owl, Ketupa ketupu - vagrant
 Caprimulgidae
 Nightjar species, Caprimulgus - vagrant
 Apodidae
 Pacific swift, Apus pacificus - vagrant
 White-throated needletail, Hirundapus caudacutus - vagrant
 Alcedinidae
 Collared kingfisher, Todiramphus chloris - vagrant
 Meropidae
 Rainbow bee-eater, Merops ornatus - vagrant
 Coraciidae
 Dollarbird, Eurystomus orientalis - vagrant
 Motacillidae
 Grey wagtail, Motacilla cinerea - vagrant
 Yellow wagtail, Motacilla flava - vagrant
 Passeridae
 Java sparrow, Padda oryzivora - introduced, extinct
 Ploceidae
 Asian golden weaver, Ploceus hypoxanthus - introduced, extinct
 Hirundinidae
 Barn swallow, Hirundo rustica - regular visitor
 Tree martin, Petrochelidon nigricans
 Asian house-martin, Delichon dasypus - vagrant 
 Zosteropidae
 Christmas white-eye, Zosterops natalis - introduced, breeding
 Turdidae
 Christmas thrush, Turdus poliocephalus erythropleurus - introduced, extinct
 Muscicapidae
 Gray-streaked flycatcher, Muscicapa griseisticta - vagrant
 Dark-sided flycatcher, Muscicapa sibirica - vagrant
 Asian brown flycatcher, Muscicapa dauurica - vagrant
 Blue-and-white flycatcher, Cyanoptila cyanomelana - vagrant
 Narcissus flycatcher, Ficedula narcissina - vagrant
 Mugimaki flycatcher, Ficedula mugimaki - vagrant
 Blue rock-thrush, Monticola solitarius - vagrant
 Sturnidae
 Rosy starling, Pastor roseus - vagrant

Mammals

There are no native land mammals.  Two species of rodent, the house mouse and black rat, have been introduced to the southern atoll but are absent from North Keeling.  Rabbits were introduced but have become extinct.  Two species of Asian deer, the Indian muntjac (Muntiacus muntjak), and Sambar (Cervus unicolor), were introduced but did not persist.  Marine mammals recorded stranding on, or seen passing by, the islands include:
 Sirenia
 Dugong, Dugong dugon – seen in the lagoon of the southern atoll
 Cetacea
 Bottlenose dolphin, Tursiops truncatus – regularly seen
 Common dolphin, Delphinus delphis – regularly seen
 Pilot whale, Globicephala species
 Humpback whale, Megaptera novaeangliae
 Cuvier's beaked whale, Ziphius cavirostris
 Sperm whale, Physeter macrocephalus

Reptiles
Terrestrial reptiles include three geckos and a blind-snake, all of which may have been inadvertently transported to the islands by humans:
 Gekkonidae
 Mourning gecko, Lepidodactylus lugubris
 Four-clawed gecko, Gehyra mutilata
 House gecko, Hemidactylus frenatus
 Typhlopidae
 Blind snake, Typhlops braminus

Marine reptiles include:
 Hydrophiidae
 Yellow-bellied sea snake, Pelamis platurus
 Banded sea krait, Laticauda colubrina
 Chelonioidea
 Green sea turtle, Chelonia mydas - breeding
 Hawksbill sea turtle, Eretmochelys imbricata
 Olive ridley sea turtle, Lepidochelys olivacea
 Loggerhead sea turtle, Caretta caretta
 Leatherback sea turtle, Dermochelys coriacea

Fish
Over  species of fish have been recorded around the islands.

See also
Flora of the Cocos (Keeling) Islands
List of mammals of Christmas Island

References

Notes

Sources
 Anon. (2004). Pulu Keeling National Park Management Plan. Australian Government. 
 Birding-Aus Mailing List Archives
 Carter, Mike. (1994). Birds of the Cocos (Keeling) Islands. Wingspan 15: 14-18.
 Gibson-Hill, C.A. (1950). A note on the reptiles occurring on the Cocos-Keeling Islands. Bulletin of the Raffles Museum 22: 206-211.
 Gibson-Hill, C.A. (1950). Notes on the birds of the Cocos-Keeling Islands. Bulletin of the Raffles Museum 22: 212-270.
 Gibson-Hill, C.A. (1950). The Muridae of the Cocos-Keeling Islands. Bulletin of the Raffles Museum 22: 271-277.
 Gibson-Hill, C.A. (1950). A note on the Cetacea stranded on the Cocos-Keeling Islands. Bulletin of the Raffles Museum 22: 278-279.
 Hadden, Don. (2006). Cocos (Keeling) Island birds. Wingspan 16(4): 34-37.
 Stokes, Tony, Wendy Shiels and Kevin Dunn (1984). Birds of the Cocos (Keeling) Islands. 'The Emu' 84 (1): 23-29. 
 Stokes, Tony and Peter Goh (1987). Records of Herald Petrels and the Christmas Frigatebird from North Keeling Island, Indian Ocean. 'Australian Bird Watcher' 12 (4) 132-133. 
 Woodroffe, Colin D. (Editor) (1994). Ecology and Geomorphology of the Cocos (Keeling) Islands. 'Atoll Research Bulletins' 399-414. Compilation of 14 individual papers by different authors published in a single volume. The papers include an introduction to scientific studies on the Islands, and detailed reports o the climate, hydrology and water resources; Late Quaternary Morphology; Geomorphology; Reef Islands; Vegetation; Update on Birds; Marine habitats; Sediment Facies; Hydrodynamic observations; Hermatypic corals; Marine molluscs; Echindoderms; Fishes; Barnacles; and Decapod crustaceans.  

 
Lists of animals of Australia